This is a list of United States federal agencies that are primarily devoted to research and development, including their notable subdivisions.  These agencies are responsible for carrying out the science policy of the United States.

Independent agencies 
 National Science Foundation (NSF)
 National Aeronautics and Space Administration (NASA)
 Environmental Protection Agency Office of Research and Development
 Intelligence Advanced Research Projects Activity (IARPA)
 Smithsonian Institution research centers and programs

Department of Agriculture 
 Agricultural Research Service (ARS)
 National Institute of Food and Agriculture (NIFA)
 Economic Research Service (ERS)
 United States Forest Service Research and Development (R&D)

Department of Commerce 
 National Institute of Standards and Technology (NIST)
 National Oceanic and Atmospheric Administration (NOAA)

Department of Defense
 Defense Advanced Research Projects Agency (DARPA)
 Uniformed Services University of the Health Sciences (USU)

Department of the Air Force 
 Air Force Research Laboratory (AFRL)
 Air Force Life Cycle Management Center (AFLCMC)
 Air Force Nuclear Weapons Center (NWC)
 Air Force Institute of Technology (AFIT)
 Space Systems Command (SSC)

Department of the Army 
 United States Army Materiel Command (AMC)
 Army Research, Development and Engineering Command (RDECOM)
 Army Research Laboratory (ARL)
 Army Armament Research, Development and Engineering Center (ARDEC) 
 Engineer Research and Development Center (ERDC)
 U.S. Army Test and Evaluation Command (ATEC)
 Army Medical Research and Material Command (USAMRMC)

Department of the Navy 
 Marine Corps Combat Development Command (MCCDC)
 United States Marine Corps Warfighting Laboratory (MCWL)
 Office of Naval Research (ONR)
 Naval Research Laboratory (NRL)
 Bureau of Medicine and Surgery (BUMED)
 Naval Medical Research Center (NMRC)
 Naval Air Warfare Center (NASC)
 Naval Surface Warfare Center (NSWC)
 Naval Undersea Warfare Center (NUWC)
 Naval Command, Control and Ocean Surveillance Warfare Center (NCCOSC)
 Naval Postgraduate School (NPS)
 Naval Air Weapons Station China Lake (NAWSCL)
 United States Naval Observatory (USNO)

Department of Education 
 Institute of Education Sciences (IES)
 National Institute on Disability and Rehabilitation Research (NIDRR)

Department of Energy 
 Office of Science (DOE SC)
 Advanced Research Projects Agency-Energy (ARPA-E)
 National Laboratories

Department of Health and Human Services 
 National Institutes of Health (NIH)
 National Institute for Occupational Safety and Health (NIOSH)
 Food and Drug Administration science and research programs
 Agency for Healthcare Research and Quality (AHRQ)
 Biomedical Advanced Research and Development Authority (BARDA)

Department of Homeland Security 
 Directorate for Science and Technology (S&T)
 Coast Guard Research & Development Center (CG RDC)

Department of the Interior 
 United States Geological Survey (USGS)

Department of Justice 
 National Institute of Justice (NIJ)

Department of Transportation 
 Research and Innovative Technology Administration
 Federal Aviation Administration Research, Engineering, and Development
 Federal Highway Administration Research and Technology

Environmental Protection Agency
 Air Research
 Water Research
 Climate Change Research
 Ecosystems Research
 Land, Oil Spill, and Waste Management Research
 Homeland Security Research

Veterans Affairs 
 Veterans Health Administration Office of Research and Development (ORD)

Multi-agency initiatives 
 Office of Science and Technology Policy (OSTP)
 U.S. Global Change Research Program (USGCRP)
 Networking and Information Technology Research and Development Program (NITRD)
 National Nanotechnology Initiative (NNI)

Judicial branch 
 Federal Judicial Center

Legislative branch 
 House Committee on Science, Space and Technology
 Senate Committee on Commerce, Science, and Transportation
 Office of Technology Assessment (OTA) (defunct)

Research
.Agencies
Science and technology in the United States
Research
United States research and development agencies
Agencies, research and development